The 2009–10 1. FC Nürnberg season was the 110th season in the club's football history.

Match results

Legend

Bundesliga

Playoff

DFB-Pokal

Player information

Roster and statistics

Transfers

In

Out

Kits

Sources

1. FC Nürnberg seasons
Nuremberg